Human Nature: An Interdisciplinary Biosocial Perspective is a quarterly peer-reviewed scientific journal. It covers research on human behavior from "an interdisciplinary biosocial perspective". It was established by Jane B. Lancaster in 1990 and is published by Springer Science+Business Media. The current editor-in-chief is Louis Calistro Alvarado (Binghamton University—SUNY). As of 2021, the journal has a 2-year impact factor of 2.75 and a 5-year impact factor of 3.684.

References

External links 
 

Publications established in 1990
Psychology journals
Springer Science+Business Media academic journals
Quarterly journals
English-language journals
Anthropology journals